The United Daily News Office Building, also known as UDN Building, is a mixed-used skyscraper building located in Xinyi District, Taipei, Taiwan. It houses the corporate headquarters of United Daily News. The first to 20th floors of the building are offices whilst the 21st to 34th floors are used for residential apartment units.

Design 
The building was designed by the Taiwanese architect Kris Yao, inspired by the Daily News Building in New York City. The building's design adopts a futuristic sensation by utilising aluminum claddings as well as a glass façade. The 8-meter high office lobby is presented like a public gallery space, with sculptures of Chinese-calligraphy symbols on the walls.

Gallery

See also 
 List of tallest buildings in Taiwan
 List of tallest buildings in Taipei
 United Daily News

References

2018 establishments in Taiwan
Office buildings completed in 2018
Postmodern architecture in Taiwan
Residential skyscrapers in Taiwan
Skyscraper office buildings in Taipei